The Old Museum of Wisteria is a small historical building and museum, where Su Dongpo is believed to have spent the final years of his life in Changzhou, China. It was originally known as the Sun pavilion. Records indicate that in the year 1172, the pavilion and a statue were built in memory of Su Dongpo. Originally constructed during the Ming Dynasty, much of the original pavilion remains. The lintel is carved in a design known as 'Fangsheng'—bars of stone are placed on it, each having four characters carved upon it: Teng, Hua, Jiu and Guan. The present name of the museum derives from Wisteria plantings which are said to have been planted, along with begonias, by Su Dongpo himself.

See also
 List of museums in China

References

Biographical museums in China
Buildings and structures in Changzhou
Buildings and structures completed in 1172
Museums in Jiangsu